Division No. 9 is a census division in Alberta, Canada. It is located in the southwest corner of central Alberta and its largest urban community is the Town of Rocky Mountain House. The boundaries of the division are coextensive with the outer boundaries of Clearwater County.

Census subdivisions 
The following census subdivisions (municipalities or municipal equivalents) are located within Alberta's Division No. 9.

Towns
Rocky Mountain House
Villages
Caroline
Summer villages
Burnstick Lake
Municipal districts
Clearwater County
Indian reserves
Big Horn 144A
O'Chiese 203
Sunchild 202

Demographics 

See also 
List of census divisions of Alberta
List of communities in Alberta

References 

D09